The Tietzowsee is a lake in the Rheinsberg Lake Region in the German state of Brandenburg. It covers and area of  within the municipality of Rheinsberg.

See also
Großer Prebelowsee
Großer Zechliner See
Schwarzer See
Zootzensee

Lakes of Brandenburg
Ostprignitz-Ruppin
Federal waterways in Germany
LTietzowsee